Paraglenea is a genus of longhorn beetles of the subfamily Lamiinae, containing the following species:

 Paraglenea atropurpurea Gressitt, 1951
 Paraglenea chapaensis Breuning, 1952
 Paraglenea cinereonigra Pesarini & Sabbadini, 1996
 Paraglenea fortunei (Saunders, 1853)
 Paraglenea latefasciata Breuning, 1952
 Paraglenea swinhoei Bates, 1866
 Paraglenea transversefasciata Breuning, 1952
 Paraglenea velutinofasciata (Pic, 1939)

References

Saperdini